Mount Clear is a semi-rural suburb of Ballarat, Victoria, Australia south of the CBD in the Canadian Creek Valley.

Mount Clear is characterised by its topography of gently undulating hills flanked by bush and pine plantation forestry.  Canadian Creek, on the suburb's eastern border, flows southward.

It began as a small mining community, however it expanded rapidly in the latter 20th Century to become part of the Ballarat urban area and much subdivision activity continues.

The suburb is organised on a street hierarchy with the main roads through it being Midland Highway/Geelong Road (north-south) and Sebastopol Road (east-west).  Housing consists almost solely of single-family detached homes constructed since the 1970s on larger than average blocks.  There is a small commercial area on the corners of Geelong and Sebastopol Road.

Mount Clear had its own railway station on the Buninyong railway line but the station closed to passengers in 1930.  Mount Clear is classed as automobile dependent and traffic along its main roads are some of the heaviest in urban Ballarat with over 15,000 
vehicles per day passing through Mount Clear and expected to increase by almost 50% over the next three decades.  The main form of public transport is a bus service which runs along the Midland Highway between Buninyong and northern Ballarat at a frequency of approximately 30 minutes.

The suburb has several educational institutions catering for all age levels, including two high schools, Mount Clear College and Damascus College, two primary schools, Mount Clear Primary School and Emmaus Catholic Primary School, and a community kindergarten.

References

Suburbs of Ballarat